Schwendenera is a monotypic genus of flowering plants in the family Rubiaceae. The genus contains only one species, viz. Schwendenera tetrapyxis, which is endemic to Brazil.

References

Monotypic Rubiaceae genera
Spermacoceae